Benjamin Lee may refer to:

 Benjamin Lee (footballer) (born 1989), Danish footballer
 Benjamin Lee (Hawaii politician), managing director of the City and County of Honolulu 
 Benjamin Lee (Australian politician) (1825–1917), English-born Australian politician
 Benjamin F. Lee (1841–1926), American religious leader and educator
 Benjamin W. Lee (1935–1977), Korean-American physicist
 Benjamin Lee (academic), professor of anthropology and philosophy at the New School
 Benjamin Lee (general) (1774–1828), American military leader and political figure
 Ben Lee (born 1978), Australian musician and actor
 Ben Lee (violinist) (born 1980), British electric violinist and composer
 Benny Lee (1916–1995), British comedy actor and singer

See also
Benjamin W. Leigh (1781–1849), American lawyer and politician
Benjamin Lees (1924–2010), composer